High mobility group nucleosome-binding domain-containing protein 4 is a transcription factor that in humans is encoded by the HMGN4 gene.

Function 

The protein encoded by this gene, a member of the HMGN protein family, is thought to reduce the compactness of the chromatin fiber in nucleosomes, thereby enhancing transcription from chromatin templates. Transcript variants utilizing alternative polyadenylation signals exist for this gene.

See also 
 High-mobility group

References

Further reading 

Transcription factors